Colston is a surname, and also a given name. The name has several origins.  It is sometimes from a Middle English given name Colstan, probably from Old Norse kol "charcoal" and steinn "stone".  It may also be an English habitation name, from Colston Bassett or Car Colston in Nottinghamshire, or from Coulston in Wiltshire.

Surname 

Notable people with the surname include:

Bob Colston (1928–2013), British sports broadcaster
Charles Colston, 1st Baron Roundway (1854–1925), British Conservative Party politician
Sir Charles Colston (1891–1969), British domestic appliance manufacturer and founder of Colston-Ariston
David Colston, American politician
Edward Colston (1636–1721), British merchant, benefactor to Bristol, slave trader and Member of Parliament
Edward Colston (MP for Wells) (died 1719), English Member of Parliament
Edward Colston (U.S. Representative) (1786–1852), U.S. Representative from Virginia
Edward Francis Colston (1795–1847), English landowner, owner of Roundway Park, Wiltshire
Edward Murray Colston, 2nd Baron Roundway (1880–1944), British army officer
Fifi Colston (born 1960), New Zealander artist and author
Fred Colston (1884–1918), American tennis player
Mal Colston (1938–2003), Australian politician
Marques Colston (born 1983), American football player
Peter Colston (ornithologist) (born 1935), English ornithologist
Peter Colston (rugby union) (?–2022), English rugby union player and coach
Raleigh E. Colston (1825–1896), American professor, soldier, cartographer, and writer
William Colston (fl. 1610–1612), English settler in Newfoundland

Given name 
Notable people with the given name include:
Howell Colston Featherston (1871–1958), American politician
William Colston Leigh Sr. (1910–1992), American founder of the Leigh Bureau speakers agency
Sir Nicholas Colston Lockyer (1855–1933), Australian public servant
Edward Colston Marshall (1821–1893), American politician
Bruce Colston Trapnell Jr (born 1982), American bioinformatician
Colston Warne (1900–1987), American economist
Colston Weatherington (born 1977), American football player
Colston Westbrook (1937–1989), American teacher and linguist

See also 
Colson
Coulston (surname)

References